This is a list of wars and conflicts involving Merina Kingdom and later Madagascar since the nineteenth century to the present.

References 

 
Madagascar
Wars